The Kandy Falcons (abbreviated as KF) is a franchise cricket team which competes in 2022 Lanka Premier League. The team is based in Kandy, Central Province, Sri Lanka. In November 2022, Kandy Falcons changed their name to Kandy Falcons. The team was captained by Wanindu Hasaranga and coached by Piyal Wijetunge.

Current squad
 Players with international caps are listed in bold.
  denotes a player who is currently unavailable for selection.
  denotes a player who is unavailable for rest of the season.

Administration and support staff

Season standings

The top four teams qualify for the playoffs
 Advance to Qualifier 1
 Advance to Eliminator

League stage

Playoffs

Qualifier 1

Qualifier 2

Statistics

Most runs

Most Wickets

References 

2022 Lanka Premier League
Lanka Premier League